Khulna University is a public university in Gollamari, Khulna, Bangladesh. It is near the river Moyur, beside the Sher e Bangla Road (Khulna-Satkhira highway). The academic programs of Khulna University started on 31 August 1991 with 80 students in four disciplines. As of November 2019, the university has 29 disciplines under six schools and two institutes. It is the only public university in Bangladesh where student politics is not allowed.

History
In 1974, the Kudrat-e-Khuda Commission stated the importance of establishing a public university in Khulna Division in its final report. The government finalized the programme of establishing a university at Khulna on 4 January 1987 and the Khulna University Act was passed in the Bangladesh National Parliament in July 1990. Distinctive law named খুলনা বিশ্ববিদ্যালয় আইন (The Khulna University Act, 1990) passed in the parliament empowers the university. The university started its formal inauguration of academic activities on 25 November 1991.

Timeline
 1974: The importance of establishing a university in Khulna Division was first mentioned in the report of Kudrat-e-Khuda Commission.
 1979: (November) The Cabinet of Ministers took the decision for establishing a technical university. The local people demanded a general university.
 1985: The government formed two committees: Zillur Rahman Siddiqui Committee (for preparing academic and administrative programmes) and Mahbubuzzaman Committee (for the selection of site).
 1987: (4 January) The government finalized the programme of establishing a university at Khulna on the basis of the reports of the above committees.
 1988: (25 February) Nurul Islam, the then Divisional Commissioner, was appointed the Project Director for establishing the university.
 1988: (2 August) Abdur Rahim, the then divisional commissioner, was appointed the project director. After him Md. Abdul Bari served as project director.
 1989: (9 March) The then President Hussain Muhammad Ershad laid the foundation stone.
 1989: (1 August) Golam Rahman of Bangladesh University of Engineering and Technology (BUET) was appointed the project director.
 1990: (June) The Khulna University Act 1990 was passed in Jatiyo Sangsad.
 1990: (31 July) The Khulna University Act 1990 was published in gazette form.
 1991: (August) Project director Golam Rahman was appointed the first vice chancellor.
 1991: (3 August) First orientation was held.
 1991: (31 August) The academic programme of the university started.
 1991: (25 November) The academic programme was formally inaugurated by the then Prime Minister Begum Khaleda Zia.
 1993: (23 August) Golam Ali Fakir of Bangladesh Agricultural University (BAU) was appointed the second Vice Chancellor.
 1997: (10 April) The first convocation was held.
 1997: (23 August) S M Nazrul Islam of Bangladesh University of Engineering and Technology (BUET) was appointed the third vice chancellor.
 2001: (14 February) The second convocation was held.
 2003: (9 March) The first senate meeting was held.
 2010:(28 December) The fourth convocation was held.
 2015:(25 November) The fifth convocation was held.
 2019:(22 December) The sixth convocation was held.

The academic program of the university commenced in August 1991 with four disciplines: Computer Science and Engineering (CSE), Architecture, Business Administration (BA), and Urban and Rural Planning (URP).

In the following year, Forestry and Wood Technology (FWT) and Fisheries and Marine Resources Technology (FMRT) disciplines started up. Now there are 29 disciplines under eight schools and one institute. The medium of instruction is English.

Administration

List of vice-chancellors
 1. Golam Rahman (1 August 1991 – 22 August 1993)
 2. Golam Ali Fakir (23 August 1993 – 22 August 1997)
 3. S M Nazrul Islam (23 August 1997 – 22 August 2001)
 4. Jafor Reza Khan (29 August 2001 – 18 November 2001)
 5. M Abdul Kadir Bhuiyan (19 November 2001 – 20 March 2005)
 6. Mahbubur Rahman (20 March 2005 –  14 February 2008)
 7. Md Saifuddin Shah (15 October 2008 – 16 November 2012)
 8. Mohammad Fayek Uz Zaman (17 November 2012 – 9 January 2013)
 9. Mohammad Fayek Uz Zaman (10 January 2013 – 29 January 2021)
 12. Mahmood Hossain ( 25 May 2021—Present)

Schools, institutes and disciplines
There are eight schools and one institutes in Khulna University, which have 29 discipline:

Science, Engineering and Technology (SET) School
 Architecture (ARCH) Discipline
 Chemistry (CHEM) Discipline
 Computer Science and Engineering (CSE) Discipline
 Electronics and Communication Engineering (ECE) Discipline
 Mathematics (MATH) Discipline
 Physics (PHY) Discipline
 Statistics (STAT) Discipline
 Urban and Rural Planning (URP) Discipline

Life Science (LS) School
 Agrotechnology (AT) Discipline
 Biotechnology and Genetic Engineering (BGE) Discipline
 Environmental Science (ES) Discipline
 Fisheries and Marine Resources Technology (FMRT) Discipline
 Forestry and Wood Technology (FWT) Discipline
 Pharmacy (PHARM) Discipline
 Soil, Water and Environment (SWE) Discipline

School of Management & Business Administration (MBA)
 Business Administration (BA) Discipline
 Human Resource Management (HRM) Discipline

Social Science School
 Economics (ECON) Discipline
 Development Studies (DS) Discipline
 Sociology (SOC) Discipline
 Mass Communication and Journalism (MCJ) Discipline

Arts and Humanities School
 Bangla Language and Literature (BNL) Discipline
 English (ENG) Discipline
 History and Civilization Discipline

School of Law
 Law Discipline

Fine Arts School

Khulna University has the legacy of a century old art educational school in Bangladesh. The institute enjoys the distinction of being the only seat of art excellence, in art education, in the southern part of Bangladesh. General Information Institute of Fine Arts offers a four-year undergraduate course leading to the bachelor's degree of Fine Arts (BFA). At present, there are three disciplines:
 Drawing and Painting (DP) Discipline
 Print Making Discipline
 Sculpture Discipline

Education School

The school of Education has begun its journey from the academic year 2017–2018, by offering postgraduate degrees in teachers' training. There is one discipline:
 Institute of Education and Research
They are offering the following degrees:
 Bachelor in Education (BEd)
 Masters in Education (MEd)
 Post graduate diploma in Education (PGDEd.)

Disciplines

Agrotechnology
Agrotechnology Discipline at Khulna University was established in March 1996 with the vision of strengthening human resources and propelling the development of the Agriculture in Bangladesh. Bangladesh is an agriculture-based country and about 42% of Bangladeshi population is the farmer. But due to several socio-economic constraints and lack of knowledge of modern agriculture, farmers often fail to optimize their harvest from the farm. Agrotechnology discipline is mandated to produce skilled manpower with advanced knowledge in agriculture. The course curricula of this discipline are upgraded. The curricula cover all courses that offered by the relevant institutions in the country as well as they incorporate Geographic Information System (GlS), Spreadsheet Analysis, and Computer Studies.

The discipline is striving continuously to ensure quality education for students. It is producing successfully at least 40 skilled agriculturists every year. The discipline has also started producing specialist with postgraduate education (MS) in Agronomy, Horticulture, Plant Pathology, Agricultural Extension and Rural Development and Genetics and Plant Breeding. Higher education in other branches of agriculture will be offered in near future. Some students have already enrolled in the discipline for studying Ph.D. from the Session 2009–2010. Moreover, the teachers and students of the discipline are involved in conducting research on different current local and national problems and papers & articles have been publishing in national and international journals, newspapers and books, etc. It also arranges national seminar, training programs and workshops for farmers, researchers and local entrepreneurs for improving the status of the beneficiaries.

Agrotechnology Discipline of Khulna University has energetic and skilled manpower. All the teachers are highly qualified. Majority of them have the highest degree i.e., Ph.D. They have got their higher degrees from various universities and institutions of home and abroad and hence utilize their knowledge and skill for the development of the agricultural sector (in respect of research and education) of Bangladesh. The discipline is continuing various projects funded by different reputed funding organizations such as USDA, ACIAR, KGF, BARC, KU Research Cell, Ministry of Education, Ministry of Science and Technology and UGC etc.

Agrotechnology Discipline also works with some modern technologies like biotechnology, tissue culture, genetic engineering, protected agriculture, heat stress mitigation, irrigation management, IPM (Integrated Pest Management), biological control (BC) of pests, etc. The discipline is also collecting and evaluating germplasm through its ‘Germplasm Center’. Agrotechnology Discipline has some new and on-going technologies and varieties that are going to be released soon.

Architecture Discipline
Architecture Discipline is the second architectural discipline in Bangladesh and one of the first four disciplines opened at Khulna University, which formally launched its academic activities under SET School in 1991. The curriculum of Architecture provides the students with knowledge of man, his society, his physical environment and the technological development round the world. The Bachelor of Architecture (BArch) program of the discipline is designed for a period of five years. There is also an opportunity to have a master's degree

Bangla Language and Literature discipline
Bangla discipline was introduced in the year 2010–2011. It offers B.A.Hons. in Bangla Language and Literature. An MS program will be introduced soon.

Biotechnology and Genetic Engineering discipline
Biotechnology and Genetic Engineering (the then Biotechnology) Discipline launched its academic activities in 1995. In 2003, the discipline was renamed as "Biotechnology and Genetic Engineering". The discipline offers a four years professional BSc degree in Biotechnology and Genetic Engineering and two-year MS degree in Biotechnology and Genetic Engineering.

Business Administration discipline
The Business Administration Discipline began in 1991. The university offers a 4-year bachelor's degree in Business Administration (BBA). The university has run management training programs for the Bangladesh naval officers since 1995. The school introduced a regular MBA program in 2002, and an Executive MBA (EMBA) program in 2005. BAD offers a contemporary quality admission process to have the finest students to be a part of it & the university.

Chemistry discipline
Chemistry discipline started in the academic session 2009–2010. It has a B.Sc. (Hons.) in chemistry program. It also offers M.Sc. in chemistry program.

Computer Science and Engineering discipline
In 1991, the Computer Science and Engineering (CSE) Discipline of Khulna University started its academic activities with 20 undergraduate students in Bachelor of Science in Computer Science and Engineering. Since then around 600 undergraduate students (of 17 batches) have graduated from the discipline. A perfect 100% of graduates work in government and private organizations as well as in teaching professions in home and abroad.  CSE discipline takes 40 students at the undergraduate level in each year.

With the support from the Ministry of Science and Information Communication Technology, CSE discipline has run a postgraduate Diploma in Information Technology (PGD-IT) program since 2001. The discipline has achieved its target by producing around 200 PGD-IT professionals.

In 2011, CSE discipline has introduced an MSc.Engineering (CSE) degree. Students of MSc.Engineering (CSE) will benefit from the memorandum of understanding between the CSE discipline of Khulna University and the Department of Computer Science of University of Saskatchewan, Canada.

Students of CSE have a computer club named Club for Updated Search on Computer (CLUSTER). CLUSTER arranges seminar, programming contest and publishes magazines.

Development Studies discipline
Khulna University is the second public university in Bangladesh which offers Bachelor of Development Studies BSS (Hons.) program. Development Studies Discipline offers a four-year BSS (Hons.) in Bachelor of Development Studies under Social Science School. This discipline was introduced in the academic year 2011–2012. Development Studies discipline now takes 45 students at the undergraduate level in each year. In accordance with the information of 2017, there are about six batches under Bachelor of Development Studies BSS (Hons.) program. The first batch of this discipline is known as DS'12, sequentially DS'13, DS'14, and others. This discipline has a lot of achievements in extra-curricular activities (mostly in sports) among the inter-discipline events.

The Development Studies discipline has Bachelor in Development Studies and Masters in Development Studies programs.

Economics discipline
Economics Discipline started its journey during the year 1999. Over the year it has established itself as one of the finest economics learning institutions in Bangladesh. Graduates of this renowned discipline (department) are contributing in the field of Education, research, government services and in other private sectors.

The curriculum of this discipline has been framed by blending both theoretical and practical courses. The discipline is offering four-year Bachelor of Social Science BSS (Hons.) in Economics degree, 1.5 years Masters in Economics degree and 1.5 years Masters in Development and Policy Studies (MDPS).

For better information please follow the following link. https://discipline.ku.ac.bd/econ

Electronics and Communication Engineering discipline
Electronics and Communication Engineering was offered in 1997 under School of Science, Engineering and Technology (SET) of Khulna University. This discipline is the first of its kind in Bangladesh (i.e., it is the first discipline in Bangladesh that offers undergraduate degree Electronics mean of communication subjects as well as Electronics). Beside regular study curriculum it conducts a project fair every year at the world telecommunication day. The students bring their electronics based projects to the fair. The best ones are rewarded. The discipline has a seminar library, a digital electronics lab, an electrical lab, an analog communication lab, a digital communication lab, a biomedical engineering lab, a computer lab, Microwave and Antenna lab.

ECE discipline offers a four-year BSc. Engineering. degree in Electronics and Communication Engineering. Till 2015, 16 batches have completed their studies. In April 2012, ECE discipline commenced an MSc Engineering. in ECE program with focus on Electronics and Communication Engineering. PhD Programs in Electronics and Communications Engineering has already been launched from the academic year 2016–2017.

Students of ECE has operated a club named "ROUTER" for Updated Search on ICT Based Technology. ROUTER arranges seminar, project fair, and publishes ICT based magazines. ROUTER is the club of the students of Electronics & Communication Engineering Discipline of Khulna University. Which elaborates as "Roaming Over the Universe Through Electronic Roadway." The theme line of the club is "In search of a new frontier."

English discipline
Khulna University includes English Literature and English language in its curriculum. English discipline came into existence in 1998, but the academic activities started from 1999. A language center was established. In Bangladesh, English Literature is a celebrated curriculum preferred by the students. The discipline is GPA-oriented.

Under Arts and Humanities School, English discipline offers one undergraduate and two postgraduate programmes; one of the two MAs is MA in English, with courses in contemporary literature in English, linguistics, and literary theory; the other is MA in English Language that teaches current theoretical and practical courses in English language and linguistics.

Environmental Science discipline
Environmental Science as an undergraduate teaching programme is relatively a new one in this country. Khulna University opened the discipline in 1997. The subject incorporates physical, chemical and biological sciences, engineering and technology, socio-economics and management. The discipline offers a four-year undergraduate (Bachelor of Science in Environmental Science) and one and half years postgraduate (Master of Science in Environmental Science) degrees and offers a PhD programme.

Fisheries and Marine Resources Technology discipline
The greater Khulna region, the south west part of Bangladesh has been characterized by a blend of aquatic habitats; fresh, brackish and marine waters supporting a diversity of biological and physical resources. Situated a few kilometers away from the Bay of Bengal, this region has Sundarbans, the world largest mangrove forest crisscrossed by creeks and canals.

Understanding the potential of such resources to the prospects of the country, the Fisheries and Marine Resources Technology Discipline was established in 1992 with a mandate to establish an avenue for research and academic programs in all aspects of fisheries for the second time in the country after Chittagong University. Chittagong University introduced undergraduate and postgraduate level education in Marine Science under the Institute of Marine Science and Fisheries (IMSCU) in early seventies . Over the last fourteen years the FMRT Discipline has experienced substantial growth resulting in a reputation for training and research, particularly with respect to coastal aquaculture and mangrove ecosystem.

The course followed in the discipline has provisions for education in biology, ecology, culture and post harvest fisheries. The course, in addition, involves socio-economics, statistics, GIS and remote sensing, computer application etc. The teaching staff of the discipline possess knowledge in fish biology, marine science, aquaculture, fisheries management, genetics and fish breeding, ecology, oceanography and post harvest technology. The FMRT discipline is now preparing to launch PhD courses in addition to BSc and M.S. ones.

Forestry and Wood Technology discipline
Khulna University launched Forestry and Wood Technology (FWT) discipline as second university in Bangladesh, in 1992. It is offering a four-year Bachelor of Science (Honors) degree in forestry and a one-year Master of Science (MS) degree in forestry. The discipline is close to the world's largest single-tract mangrove forest, Sundarbans, and the forest-deficient northern region of the country where forest extension and social forestry programme are increasingly realized. Given this geographic consideration, the mission of FWT discipline in education and research stresses on mangrove forestry, social forestry, forest management, forest tree improvement and wood science and technology.

History and Civilization discipline
History and Civilization Discipline will start their journey from the academic year 2016–2017, offering a 4-year Bachelor of Arts degree (abbreviated as B.A. (Hons.)) in History and Civilization.

Human Resource Management discipline
Human Resource Management (HRM) is a newly introduced discipline in Khulna University. The discipline has begun a Bachelor program from the academic year 2015–2016.

Law and Justice Discipline
Law and Justice discipline is another new discipline of Khulna University, offering 4 years LLB(Hons) course from the academic year 2016–2017. Their LLM program will start soon.

Mass Communication and Journalism discipline
Mass Communication and Journalism (MCJ) discipline is a newly introduced discipline, commencing a Bachelor program from academic year 2015–2016.

Mathematics discipline
The Mathematics (Math) discipline was opened from the academic session 1998–99, offering a four-year undergraduate course leading to the degree of Bachelor of Science (Honors) in Mathematics, abbreviated as B.Sc. (Hons.) in Mathematics and Masters of Science in Applied Mathematics abbreviated as M.Sc. in Applied Mathematics. This discipline also offers Ph.D. program from researchers.The discipline provides Sir AF Mujibur Rahman Foundation Gold medals and cheques to the students who are excellence in Mathematics.The Medal is awarded for B.Sc. and M.Sc. students.

Pharmacy discipline
Most of the present day medicines are directly or indirectly obtained from plants of local origin and those of the Sundarbans, a large source of medicinal plants. Some of the reported medicinal plants enjoy their use in the herbal preparation. But most of the plants need to be scientifically evaluated. To this end, Pharmacy Discipline started its academic activities in 1997 under Life Science School offering a four years Bachelor of Pharmacy (Hons.) degree with an aim of proper evaluation of the plants of medicinal value available in the mangrove forest as well as of medicinal plants in the native southern region.

Physics discipline
Physics Discipline started its journey in 28th March of 2010 with 38 students in its inauguration batch in the academic session 2009–2010. This discipline currently offers B.Sc.(Hons.), M.Sc. in physics. This discipline is also enrolling students for M.Phil. and PhD program in Physics. This discipline achieved two gold medalists and many trophy with 5 consecutive times championship in volleyball inter discipline tournament.

Fermineff Team from this discipline participated in International Theoretical Physics Olympiad 2020 and secured 15th position in the world and 1st position in the country. Additionally, another team from physics discipline won silver medal in University Physics Competition 2019.

Soil, Water and Environment discipline
Soil Science Discipline at Khulna University has both an illustrious past and significant prospects for contributing to the future. Established in 1999 as Soil Science Discipline, it was renamed as Soil, Water and Environment Discipline in 2017. The current name reflects the expertise and areas where the department faculty and students can and are expected to make major contributions. The discipline provides undergraduate and graduate teaching, conducts extensive research, and has significant extension outreach responsibilities. Because the soils, environment, and water resources vary greatly over the country, the discipline's activities are similarly widespread. The course and curriculum provide graduates with knowledge in the fields of soil genesis, hydrology, soil physics, soil chemistry, soil biochemistry, soil microbiology, ecology and ecosystems, soil mineralogy, soil survey, land evaluation, soil erosion and conservation, sustainable land use, watershed management, irrigation and drainage technology, groundwater hydrology, agronomy, soil fertility and plant nutrition, and soil management and others environmental related courses.

The discipline offers a four-year undergraduate programme leading to the B.Sc. (Hons.) in soil, water and environment degree. In 2008, a Masters programme was started.

Sociology discipline
Started in 2003, Sociology is one of the prominent disciplines of Khulna University under the Social Science School. The discipline offers a four-year Bachelor of Social Science (B.S.S.) Honors in Sociology degree as well as 1.5 years Masters of Social Science (M.S.S.). It also teaches students of almost all other disciplines of Khulna University to fulfill their course requirements.

Statistics discipline
Statistics Discipline under Science, Engineering and Technology (SET) School is one of the new disciplines in Khulna University. It initiated its journey in 2011–2012 academic session. At undergraduate level, statistics discipline offer majors in statistics, and decision science which can be taken in BSc (Honors) degrees. At postgraduate level, advanced courses majoring in statistics have also been offered.

The discipline is distinguished by the faculty's strong interest in the application of statistics to such diverse areas such as public policy, economics, engineering, medicine and life sciences, law, and the social and behavioral sciences. The research areas which are mainly focused here include- Data Mining, Econometrics and Quality Control, Demography and Research Methods, Experimental Design and Inference, Sampling Techniques, Inferences and Multivariate Analysis, Time Series Analysis and Forecasting, Demography, Stochastic Process, Computer Package and Programming, Biostatistics and Reliability Theory, Health Statistics, Epidemiology, Bio-informatics, Environmental Statistics and so on.

Urban and Rural Planning discipline
The Urban and Rural Planning (URP) discipline was the earliest academic discipline in the country to impart planning education at undergraduate level, was established in Khulna University in 1991. It is one of the four disciplines with which Khulna University started its academic programme. The urban and rural planning discipline offers a four-year undergraduate degree in urban and rural planning. The discipline offers a master's degree programme in urban and rural planning.
 Degree programs: BURP, MURP, PhD
 Laboratories: Geographic Information System (GIS), Remote Sensing (RS), Planning Information System (PIS)
 Library: Seminar Library
 Research Center: Planning and Development Research Center (PDRC)
 Discipline Journal: Plan Plus
 Khulna University planners alumni

Degrees offered by KU

School of Life Science
 Agrotechnology: BSc. (Hons.), MSc., PhD
 Biotechnology: BSc., MSc., PhD
 Environment Science: BSc., MSc., PhD
 Fisheries and Marine Resource Technology Discipline: BSc., MSc., PhD
 Forestry and Wood Technology: BSc. (Hons.), MSc, PhD
 Pharmacy Discipline: B.Pharm., M.Pharm.
 Soil, Water and Environment Discipline: BSc.(Hons.), MSc., PhD

School of Science, Engineering and Technology
 Architecture: BArch, MScHS
 Computer Science and Engineering: BSc. Engg. (accredited by the Institute of Engineers, Bangladesh, the second discipline in Bangladesh offering an engineering degree in CSE), MSc. Engg., MCA, PhD, PGDIT
 Chemistry: BSc (Hons.), MSc., PhD
 Electronics and Communication Engineering: BSc. Engg. (accredited by the IEB), MSc. Engg., PhD
 Mathematics: BSc. (Hons.), MSc., PhD
 Physics: BSc. (Hons.), MSc., PhD
 Statistics: BSc. (Hons.), MSc., PhD
 Urban and Rural Planning: BURP, MURP, PhD

School of Management and Business Administration
 Business Administration: BBA, MBA, MBA (Evening), Defense MBA
 Human Resource Management: BBA, MBA

School of Social Science
 Economics: BSS (Hons.), MSS, MDPS, PhD
 Social Science: BSS (Hons.), MSS, MPGS, PhD
 Development Studies: BSS (Hons.), MDS, PhD
 Mass Communication and Journalism: BSS (Hons.)

School of Arts and Humanities
 Bangla

School of Law
 Law: LLB, LLM

Fine Arts School
 Fine Arts School offers BFA and MFA degrees.

Education School
Institute of Education and Research :BEd, MEd, PGDEd.

Central library 
Khulna University Central library was established in 1987. Before, it was housed at Academic Building I, D block. The library room has a floor space of 5,000 sq. ft. (465 sq meters). The library has its own building now. The reading room has accommodation for 125 students, 25 teachers and research scholars working simultaneously. Khulna University library has a collection of 25,000 reading materials, including 23,000 books and 200 bound volumes of journals. The university library has a computer network for communication with national and international universities and institutions through the Internet.

The library is linked with the Automation and Networking of Science Technology Libraries in Bangladesh (BANSLINK) a pilot project of the Ministry of Science and Technology, government of Bangladesh and Bangladesh National Scientific and Technical Documentation Center (BANSDOC) is the executing agency of the Project. Khulna University also linked with Bangladesh Education and Research Network. (BERNET) Project organized by University Grants Commission (UGC), Bangladesh.

The central library is a Wi-Fi hotspot.

Khulna University Central Temple 
Khulna University Central Temple was established in 2020. It is situated in front of Aparajita Hall and Sir Acharya Jagadish Chandra Academic Building. The main temple is about 1100 square feet and the temple compound is about 3,000 sqaure feet. The then Vice Chancellor Md Fayek Uzzaman inaugurated the temple in 24th September, 2020. Hindu students of the university observe Sarawsati Puja here every year. A magazine "Panchami" is published each year during the Sarawsati Puja. Besides, Krishna Janmashtami is observed annually by the hindu students. They also observe Diwali every year over the campus including Hadi Chattar, Main Gate. Additionally, Khichuri Prasad is arranged frequently by the hindu students of the university.

Student accommodation 

The university has five halls of residence for the students. Two more student halls are under process:
 Khan Jahan Ali Hall (Male)
 Khan Bahadur Ahsanullah Hall (Male)
 Jatir Janak Bangabandhu Sheikh Mujibur Rahman Hall (Male)
 Aparajita Hall (Female)
 Bangamata Sheikh Fojilatunnesa Mujib Hall (Female)

See also
 Islamic University, Bangladesh (IU)
 Jashore University of Science and Technology (JUST)
 Khulna Agricultural University ( KAU)
 Sheikh Hasina Medical University ( SHMU or KMU)
 Bangladesh University of Textiles (BUTEX)
 Military Institute of Science and Technology (MIST)
Khulna University of Engineering & Technology (KUET)
Jahangirnagar University (JU)

References

External links 
 Official website

 
Public universities of Bangladesh
Educational institutions established in 1991
Forestry education
Architecture schools in Bangladesh
Education in Khulna
1991 establishments in Bangladesh
Organisations based in Khulna
Educational institutions of Khulna District